Chen Shyh-kwei or Steven Chen (born 8 April 1952), is a Taiwanese politician who was the Minister of the Overseas Community Affairs Council of the Executive Yuan from 1 August 2013 until 20 May 2016.

Education
Chen earned  his bachelor's degree in political science from National Taiwan University and master's degree in civil service education from National Chengchi University. He also studied public administration at Northern Illinois University in the United States.

References

1952 births
Living people
Political office-holders in the Republic of China on Taiwan
Politicians of the Republic of China on Taiwan from Yilan County, Taiwan
Kuomintang politicians in Taiwan